Michael Adlerstein is Assistant Secretary General of the United Nations and Executive Director of the United Nations Capital Master Plan, a five-year program to restore and renovate the historic United Nations Headquarters in New York, NY. He was appointed to the position by United Nations Secretary-General Ban Ki-moon in July 2007.

Adlerstein obtained his architectural degree from Rensselaer Polytechnic Institute and was a Loeb Fellow at Harvard University’s Graduate School of Design.

He has experience in restoration of historical sites. Before joining the United Nations, he was the Vice-President and Chief Architect at the New York Botanical Garden,  where he headed a multi-year restoration and design initiative. He previously served in positions throughout the National Park Service. In this capacity, he was in charge of the planning, design and construction program for the north-east region, including partnership projects at Gettysburg, Valley Forge, Acadia and Jamestown.

In the 1980', he served as Project Director for the restoration of Ellis Island and the Statue of Liberty, the United States Department of the Interior's most ambitious historic restoration project. In this position, he managed and led the team of architects and engineers to plan, design, and construct the Ellis Island. The success of the project led to his promotion as Chief Historical Architect. He was recognized as the national expert in the field of historic preservation.

He served as a Peace Corps Volunteer in Colombia, and has worked as a State Department consultant on preservation issues on projects, including the preservation of the Taj Mahal.

He has won awards for his achievements and was made a Fellow of the American Institute of Architects.

Since 2017, he has been teaching architecture classes as an adjunct professor at Columbia University, specializing in historic preservation.

References

Living people
Rensselaer Polytechnic Institute alumni
Harvard Graduate School of Design alumni
American officials of the United Nations
Year of birth missing (living people)